The Pruitts of Southampton is an American situation comedy that aired during the 1966-67 season on the ABC network. The show was based on the novel House Party (1954) by Patrick Dennis. It was ABC's attempt to turn female stand-up comic Phyllis Diller into a sitcom comedienne very much in the style of Lucille Ball. Child actress Lisa Loring formerly of TV’s The Addams Family also had a small role on the show as Phyllis’s daughter 
Suzy Pruitt.

The program starred Diller as Phyllis Pruitt, and featured Gypsy Rose Lee and Richard Deacon in supporting roles with Diller feeling the series was an inverted version of The Beverly Hillbillies.  The show's producers originally sought comic actress Beatrice Lillie in the Diller role.  Exteriors of the Biltmore Estate in Asheville, North Carolina were used as the locale.

In 2002, TV Guide ranked it number 20 on its TV Guide's 50 Worst TV Shows of All Time list.

Premise
The Pruitts, a supposedly incredibly wealthy family living on Long Island in the Hamptons, have been approached by the Internal Revenue Service about overdue taxes.  An audit revealed that the Pruitts were in fact broke.  Rather than reveal this fact publicly and cause the economic depression which would presumably result, an improbably charitable IRS allowed them to continue living in their mansion and maintaining the pretensions of great wealth, which was difficult given their reduced circumstances. By mid-season, in order to raise more money, Phyllis Pruitt had opened the mansion to boarders, attracting a "nutty" collection of tenants as well, a group that included Paul Lynde as her hopeless brother, John Astin as her brother-in-law, and Marty Ingels as a handyman.

In the premiere episode, Phyllis Pruitt unsuccessfully tries to roast a turkey in a front-loading washing machine.

Development and history
The show was created by executive producer David Levy, who also served in the same capacity on the ABC television series The Addams Family from 1964 to 1966. When ABC canceled that show in the spring of 1966, a few Addams Family alumni were recruited for the Diller series. Vic Mizzy, who composed the finger-snapping theme song to The Addams Family, composed the musical theme for Diller's show as well.

According to Television magazine, The Pruitts of Southampton finished 77th among the 91 shows rated during the 1966–1967 season. It began the season airing on Tuesdays, opposite The Red Skelton Hour on CBS, which finished second in the ratings.

On January 13, 1967, with the episode "Little Miss Fixit", the program changed its title to The Phyllis Diller Show. John Astin, who played Gomez Addams on The Addams Family, joined the cast the same month, and the show began airing on Fridays. In addition, the series marked a reunion for Astin and Marty Ingels who had starred in the 1962-1963 ABC-TV  sitcom, I'm Dickens, He's Fenster.

In the fall of 1968, NBC signed Diller to a weekly variety series hoping that the comedian would have the same kind of success that Carol Burnett had achieved for the rival network CBS. The program, entitled The Beautiful Phyllis Diller Show, did poorly in ratings and was canceled after three months.

Episode list

References
 Brooks, Tim and Marsh, Earle, The Complete Directory to Prime Time Network and Cable TV Shows

Notes

See also
Keeping Up Appearances, a 1990 British comedy series 
Schitt's Creek, a 2015 Canadian comedy series
Arrested Development

External links

Commercial site with Videoclip of opening sequence

Television shows based on American novels
American Broadcasting Company original programming
1960s American sitcoms
1966 American television series debuts
1967 American television series endings
Television series about families
Television series by MGM Television
Television shows set in New York (state)
Television series by Filmways
Works set in country houses